Bapu Joshi (10 March 1912 – 2 March 1994) was an Indian cricket umpire. He stood in 12 Test matches between 1949 and 1965.

See also
 List of Test cricket umpires

References

1912 births
1994 deaths
Place of birth missing
Indian Test cricket umpires